BCBP may refer to:

Bar Coded Boarding Pass
 Bureau of Customs and Border Protection